Gibberula jayi is a species of sea snail, a marine gastropod mollusk, in the family Cystiscidae.

Description
The length of the shell attains 2.7 mm.

Distribution
This marine species occurs ioo Réunion.

References

jayi
Gastropods described in 2014